Thomas "Tawgs" Salter is a Canadian musician, songwriter, producer and recording engineer. His extensive body of musical work includes a vast array of artists ranging from Josh Groban, Lights and Lenka to Chantal Kreviazuk, Fefe Dobson, Dear Rouge, Midway State and USS. Salter has also worked alongside Grammy-winning writer/producer Walter Afanasieff. Salter's music, production and collaborations have been featured on television shows, including Vampire Diaries, Grey's Anatomy, American Idol and The Simpsons to films such as Prom Night and Joe Somebody (Tom Wilson).

Career
Salter's writing and production of the soaring pop ballad You Are Loved (Don't Give Up), Josh Groban's first single from his multi-platinum selling third studio album Awake, reached #9 on the Adult Contemporary Billboard chart. The song was sung by Lisa Simpson on the television show The Simpsons in Season 20, Episode 9.

On December 15, 2009, Canadian singer-songwriter LIGHTS was acknowledged with two No.1 song awards by SOCAN, alongside writing partner Salter, who helped her pen her smash hits Drive My Soul and Saviour. Drive My Soul reached the top spot on MuchMusic Countdown on January 8, 2009.

In 2012, Tawgs Salter produced "Drive", the debut song of American actor and singer Cheyenne Jackson.

In 2016, he produced Chantal Kreviazuk's album Hard Sail.

Also in 2016 he appeared on Schiller's Future album (For You).

Discography

Awards and nominations

|-
| style="text-align:center;"| 2018
| Thomas "Tawgs" Salter
| Juno Awards - Producer of the Year
| 
|-
| style="text-align:center;"| 2017
| Serena Ryder - "Electric Love"
| SOCAN Awards - No. 1 Song Award
| 
|-
| style="text-align:center;"| 2017
| Mother Mother - "The Drugs"
| SOCAN Awards - No. 1 Song Award
| 
|-

| style="text-align:center;"| 2016
| Scott Helman - "Bungalow"
| SOCAN Awards - Pop/Rock Music
| 
|-
| style="text-align:center;"| 2016
| Trevor Guthrie - "Summertime"
| SOCAN Awards - Dance Music
| 
|-
| style="text-align:center;"| 2016
| Thomas "Tawgs" Salter
| Juno Awards - Producer of the Year
| 
|-
| style="text-align:center;"| 2015
| Thomas "Tawgs" Salter
| Juno Awards - Producer of the Year
| 
|-
| style="text-align:center;"| 2015
| Lights - Little Machines
| Juno Awards - Pop Album of the Year
| 
|-
| style="text-align:center;"| 2014
| Walk Off the Earth - "Red Hands"
| SOCAN Awards - Pop/Rock Music
| 
|-
| style="text-align:center;"| 2014
| Thomas "Tawgs" Salter
| Juno Awards - Producer of the Year
| 
|-
| style="text-align:center;"| 2013
| Newworldson - "Learning To Be The Light"
| ASCAP Christian Music Awards
| 
|-
| style="text-align:center;"| 2012
| Fefe Dobson - "Can't Breathe"
| SOCAN Awards - Pop/Rock Music
| 
|-

References

Living people
Canadian pop musicians
Musicians from the Regional Municipality of Niagara
Year of birth missing (living people)